Holger Löhr (born 25 July 1970) is a German male handball player. He was a member of the Germany men's national handball team. He was part of the  team at the 1996 Summer Olympics, playing three matches. On club level he played for VfL Gummersbach in Gummersbach.

References

1970 births
Living people
German male handball players
Handball players at the 1996 Summer Olympics
Olympic handball players of Germany
Sportspeople from Heidelberg